Stan Wertlieb is a Miami based film producer and the head of Grindstone Entertainment Group.

Background
As a producer,  Wertlieb's work is mainly in the action genre. Some of the films he has been involved in include First Kill, Gotti,  Last Knights, The Frozen Ground and Escape Plan: The Extractors.

As of 2019, Wertlieb was still heading Grindstone Entertainment as its principal.

Career
During the 90s, Wertlieb had a short career as an actor. He appeared in Hawkeye (1988) as Tony Caprisio  and in Blood Street (1988) as MacDonald. He was also in the 1998 film, Welcome to Hollywood as operation redline producer.

In 2007, the CFO of Grindstone Entertainment was Barry Brooker. Wertlieb's role was to work closely with him in targeting programming for the organization. He was later Head of acquisitions and later, the principal.

Among his earliest work as a producer was the 2003 sci-fi film, Silent Warnings which he co-produced with Jeffrey Beach and Phillip Roth.
Along with Barry Brooker, Wertlieb was the executive producer for Andrew Paquin's debut film, Open House.  He also co-produced the 2017 film Aftermath which starred Arnold Schwarzenegger, Scoot McNairy and Maggie Grace.

References

External links
 Imdb: Stan Wertlieb
 Paul Mecurio Show: Interview

American film producers
American chief executives
1953 births
Living people